Warren County is a county located in the northeastern Piedmont region of the U.S. state of North Carolina, on the northern border with Virginia, made famous for a landfill and birthplace of the environmental justice movement. As of the 2020 census, its population was 18,642. Its county seat is Warrenton. It was a center of tobacco and cotton plantations, education, and later textile mills.

History
The county was established in 1779 from the northern half of Bute County. It was named for Joseph Warren of Massachusetts, a physician and general in the American Revolutionary War who was killed at the Battle of Bunker Hill. Developed as a tobacco and cotton farming area, its county seat of Warrenton became a center of commerce and was one of the wealthiest towns in the state from 1840 to 1860. Many planters built fine homes there.

In the later nineteenth century, the county developed textile mills. In 1881, parts of Warren County, Franklin County and Granville County were combined to form Vance County. In the late nineteenth and early twentieth centuries, Warren County's continued reliance on agriculture slowed its development. Many residents migrated to cities for work.

From 1990 to 2016, manufacturing employment rates declined by about two-thirds. Since the late 20th century, county residents have worked to attract other industrial and business development. Soul City, a "planned community" development, was funded by the Department of Housing and Urban Development (HUD). It has not been successful in attracting business and industry, and has not developed as much housing as intended.

Warren County PCB Landfill
Beginning in 1982, Warren County was the site of the Warren County PCB Landfill. The state of North Carolina evaluated 90 different locations before determining Warren County was the best available site for the PCB landfill. The site of the Warren County PCB landfill at the time of the 1980 census was 66% black. Additionally, the area had a mean family income of $10,367 (amongst the lowest of any of the 90 sites considered), and 90% of the black population was living under the poverty level.

The final two locations for the landfill came down to Warren County and a county called Chatham that was eventually dropped because it was publicly owned land. On July 2, 1982, the NAACP made a final attempt to block the creation of the landfill on the basis of racial discrimination. Their plea was denied by the Federal District court stating that race was not an issue because "throughout all the Federal and State hearings and private party suits, it was never suggested that race was a motivating factor in the location of the landfill". In response to the court's decision to make Warren County the site of the PCB landfill, protests ensued. The National Association for the Advancement of Colored People (NAACP) staged a massive protest where more than 500 protesters were arrested. Not only did the protest impact the community itself, but it emerged as the birthplace of many environmental justice studies in regard to hazardous waste facilities being placed in minority communities. Without the protests and displeasures that the African Americans voiced in Warren County, the United Church of Christ would not have studied the implicit bias found while examining where hazardous waste facilities were placed all over the United States.

Five years later, the United Church of Christ published a report that race was the most significant factor in determining where hazardous waste facilities would be placed. Finding 3 out of every 5 African Americans and Hispanics live in a community housing a toxic waste site. This led to both Presidents George Bush Sr. and Bill Clinton to implement policy to make sure that waste sites would not be placed in completely minority neighborhoods. The site was not made safe until 2004.

Geography

State and local protected areas 
 Kerr Lake State Recreation Area (part)
 Magnolia Ernest Recreation Park

Major water bodies 
 Big Stone House Creek
 Cabin Branch
 Fishing Creek
 Hawtree Creek
 John H. Kerr Reservoir
 Jorden Creek
 Lake Gaston
 Phoebes Creek
 Possumquarter Creek
 Reedy Creek
 Roanoke River
 Sandy Creek
 Shocco Creek
 Sixpound Creek
 Smith Creek
 Walkers Creek

Adjacent counties
 Brunswick County, Virginia - north
 Northampton County - northeast
 Halifax County - east
 Franklin County - south
 Vance County - west
 Mecklenburg County, Virginia - northwest
 Nash County- southeast

Major highways

Demographics

2020 census

As of the 2020 United States census, there were 18,642 people, 7,786 households, and 4,589 families residing in the county.

2010 census
As of the 2010 United States Census, there were 20,972 people living in the county. 52.3% were Black or African American, 38.8% White, 5.0% Native American, 0.2% Asian, 2.0% of some other race and 1.6% of two or more races. 3.3% were Hispanic or Latino (of any race).

2000 census
As of the census of 2000, there were 19,972 people, 7,708 households, and 5,449 families living in the county.  The population density was 47 people per square mile (18/km2).  There were 10,548 housing units at an average density of 25 per square mile (10/km2).  The racial makeup of the county was 54.49% Black or African American, 38.90% White, 4.79% Native American, 0.13% Asian, 0.03% Pacific Islander, 0.79% from other races, and 0.88% from two or more races.  1.59% of the population were Hispanic or Latino of any race.

There were 7,708 households, out of which 28.20% had children under the age of 18 living with them, 49.20% were married couples living together, 17.30% had a female householder with no husband present, and 29.30% were non-families. 26.20% of all households were made up of individuals, and 12.20% had someone living alone who was 65 years of age or older.  The average household size was 2.48 and the average family size was 2.97.

In the county, the population was spread out, with 23.50% under the age of 18, 8.00% from 18 to 24, 26.30% from 25 to 44, 24.80% from 45 to 64, and 17.40% who were 65 years of age or older.  The median age was 40 years. For every 100 females there were 96.60 males.  For every 100 females age 18 and over, there were 95.00 males.

The median income for a household in the county was $28,351, and the median income for a family was $33,602. Males had a median income of $26,928 versus $20,787 for females. The per capita income for the county was $14,716.  About 15.70% of families and 19.40% of the population were below the poverty line, including 24.90% of those under age 18 and 20.80% of those age 65 or over.

Warren County is heavily populated by the Haliwa-Saponi, descendants of a long existing tri-racial isolate deeply rooted in the area.

Government and politics
The county favors Democratic candidates over Republicans. In the 2004 election, the county's voters favored Democrat John F. Kerry over Republican George W. Bush by 65% to 35%.

In the 2004 governor's race, Warren County supported Democrat Mike Easley by 74% to 25% over Republican Patrick J. Ballantine. Warren County is represented in the North Carolina House of Representatives by Rep. Michael H. Wray in district 27 and in the North Carolina Senate by Sen. Doug Berger in district 3. It also forms part of the 1st congressional district, which seat is held by U.S. Rep. Donald G. Davis.

Warren County has a council-manager government, governed by a five-member Board of Commissioners. County commissioners are elected to staggered four-year terms and represent one of five single-member districts of roughly equal population. The council hires a county manager for daily administration.

Warren County is a member of the Kerr-Tar Regional Council of Governments.

Communities

Towns
 Macon
 Norlina
 Warrenton (county seat and largest town)

Townships
 Fishing Creek
 Fork
 Hawtree
 Judkins
 Nutbush
 River
 Roanoke
 Sandy Creek
 Shocco
 Sixpound
 Smith Creek
 Warrenton

Unincorporated communities

 Afton
 Arcola
 Axtell
 Church Hill
 Creek
 Drewry
 Elams
 Elberon
 Embro
 Enterprise
 Five Forks
 Grove Hill
 Inez
 Liberia
 Lickskillet
 Manson
 Marmaduke
 Oakville
 Odell
 Oine
 Old Bethlehem
 Parktown
 Paschall
 Ridgeway
 Rose Hill
 Snow Hill
 Soul City
 Vaughan
 Vicksboro
 Warren Plains
 Wise

Notable people
 Braxton Bragg, Confederate General
 Thomas Bragg, Confederate Attorney General, North Carolina governor
 Eva Clayton, Congresswoman
 Kirkland Donald, United States Navy Admiral, fifth Director of the U.S. Naval Nuclear Propulsion Program
 Benjamin Hawkins, U.S. senator, Superintendent for Indian Affairs (1798-1818)
 John H. Kerr, Congressman
 Nathaniel Macon, Speaker of the U.S. House of Representatives, U.S. senator
 William Miller, North Carolina governor
 Reynolds Price, professor emeritus of English at Duke University, major author and essayist of the South
 Matt Ransom, US senator, Confederate general
 Robert Ransom, Confederate general
 Gladys Smithwick, physician, medical missionary in China and the Belgian Congo
 James Turner, North Carolina governor

See also
 List of North Carolina counties
 National Register of Historic Places listings in Warren County, North Carolina

References

External links

 
 
 Chamber of Commerce of Warren County
 The Warren Record

 
1779 establishments in North Carolina
Populated places established in 1779
Majority-minority counties in North Carolina